Luke Ray Jackson (born August 24, 1991) is an American professional baseball pitcher for the San Francisco Giants of Major League Baseball (MLB). He was drafted by the Texas Rangers in the first round, 45th overall, of the 2010 MLB draft. He made his MLB debut in 2015 with the Rangers, and has also played for the Atlanta Braves.

Early life
Jackson attended Calvary Christian Academy in Fort Lauderdale, Florida. As a senior, he went 8-0 with an 0.90 earned run average (ERA) in  innings pitched with 87 strikeouts for the baseball team. He graduated in 2010.

Professional career

Draft and minor leagues
After his senior season, he was drafted by the Texas Rangers in the first round, 45th overall, of the 2010 Major League Baseball draft. Jackson signed with the Rangers, forgoing his commitment to play college baseball at the University of Miami, for a signing bonus of $1.545 million. He made his professional debut in 2011 for the Hickory Crawdads, for whom he was 5–6 with a 5.64 ERA.

Jackson started 2012 with Hickory, and was promoted to the High-A Myrtle Beach Pelicans during the season. Between the two teams he was 10–7 with a 4.65 ERA with 146 strikeouts, the second-most among Teas minor leaguers, in 129.2 innings, and had 10.1 strikeouts per 9 innings. 

He started 2013 back with Myrtle Beach. He was named a CAR Mid-Season All-Star. Jackson was promoted to the Double-A Frisco RoughRiders during the season. Between the two teams he was 11-4 with a 2.04 ERA (the 8th-lowest ERA among all full season minor league pitchers) in 25 games (23 starts) in which he pitched 128 innings and struck out 134 batters. Batters hit .202 against him, the 7th-lowest batting-average-against among all full season pitchers. After the season, he was named the Nolan Ryan Minor League Pitcher of the Year, and an MiLB organization All Star. Baseball America rated him the 9th-best prospect in the Carolina League.

Jackson started 2014 back with Frisco. He was named a Texas Mid-Season All-Star. He was later promoted to Triple-A Round Rock Express. His aggregate 126 strikeouts were 3rd-most among Texas minor league pitchers.

In 2015, Jackson started the season with Round Rock. He converted to the bullpen in May after having started 97 of his first 101 professional games. He was called up to the majors for the first time on August 6, 2015. However, he was sent back down to Round Rock on August 11, before making an appearance with the Rangers.

Texas Rangers (2015–2016)
The Rangers again promoted Jackson to the major leagues on September 1. In 2015 with Texas he was 0-0 with a 10.80 ERA in 11.2 innings, and his fastball velocity of 96.8 mph was in the top 5% in baseball.

In 2016, Jackson split the season between Texas (8 games), the 15-day disabled list (back stiffness), and the minor leagues (with Double-A Frisco and Triple-A Round Rock; he was 1-1 with three saves and a 3.69 ERA in 46.1 innings over 36 relief appearances).

Atlanta Braves (2017–2021)
On December 8, 2016, the Rangers traded Jackson to the Atlanta Braves in exchange for pitchers Tyrell Jenkins and Brady Feigl. 

In 2017 in the majors he was 2-0 with a 4.62 ERA in 50.2 innings over 43 relief appearances, and the hard-hit percentage against him was 41.5%, in the worst 2% in baseball. Jackson was designated for assignment on December 20, 2017. 

Jackson had his contract purchased by Atlanta on April 4, 2018.  He was later designated for assignment on April 15, 2018. He cleared waivers and was outrighted to the Gwinnett Stripers. He had his contract purchased again on May 6, and was again removed from the roster two days later. On June 5, he was called up once again. Jackson was later designated for assignment again on June 13. He was called up once again on June 17. With AAA Gwinnett in 2018 he was 2-1 with a 1.69 ERA, in 21.1 innings in which he struck out 34 batters (14.3 strikeouts per 9 innings), in 10 games (one start). With Atlanta, he was 1-2 with a 4.43 ERA and one save and three holds in 40.2 innings in which he struck out 46 batters (10.18 strikeouts per 9 innings).  In 2018 he stopped throwing a changeup, threw a lower percentage of  four-seam fastballs and curveballs, and began to throw his slider more.

In 2019, he was 9–2 with 18 saves and nine holds, and a 3.84 ERA with 106 strikeouts (13.1 strikeouts per 9 innings) in  innings over 70 relief appearances. Jackson induced a 60.5% ground ball percentage, the third-highest in baseball (minimum 70 innings). He induced a chase rate of 35.1%, in the best 4% in baseball, and a whiff percentage of 36.7%, in the best 3%  of baseball.

In 2020, he was 2–0 with a 6.84 ERA in  innings over 19 relief appearances. He had a barrel percentage against of 3.1, in the best 5% in baseball.

In 2021, Jackson was 2–2 with a 1.98 ERA and 70 strikeouts in  innings in 71 games (sixth-most in the NL). His 31 holds ranked second in the major leagues. Between 2015 and 2021, he relied mostly on his 88 mph ground ball-inducing slider and 96 mph four-seam fastball, also throwing an 85 mph curveball. He won a championship ring that year as the Braves won the World Series in six games.

Prior to the 2022 season, the Braves disclosed that magnetic resonance imaging had revealed damage to the ulnar collateral ligament of Jackson's right elbow. He underwent successful Tommy John surgery on that elbow on April 13, 2022. In May, Jackson was granted a $3.6 million salary for the 2022 season via arbitration. He missed the entire 2022 season due to his surgery.

San Francisco Giants
On January 9, 2023, the San Francisco Giants announced that Jackson had been signed to a two-year contract, for a guaranteed $11.5 million, with a club option for a third season. He will earn $3 million in 2023, and $6.5 million in 2024. The Giants have an option for $7 million for 2025, with a $2 million buyout if the team declines to exercise it. Jackson will also make donations to the Giants Community Fund of $15,000 in 2023, $32,500 in 2024, and $35,000 in 2025 if the Giants exercise their option.

Personal life
Jackson and his wife Corinne welcomed a son in 2021.

References

External links

1991 births
Living people
Baseball players from Fort Lauderdale, Florida
Sportspeople from the Miami metropolitan area
Major League Baseball pitchers
Texas Rangers players
Atlanta Braves players
Hickory Crawdads players
Myrtle Beach Pelicans players
Frisco RoughRiders players
Round Rock Express players
Leones del Escogido players
American expatriate baseball players in the Dominican Republic
Gwinnett Braves players